Stanley Frederick 'Stan' Ponchard (13 February 1924  22 November 2000) was a professional rugby league footballer who played in the 1940s and 1950s. He played for the Balmain Tigers in the NSWRFL.

Biography

A Balmain junior, Ponchard played five-eighth for Balmain between 194348 and 195153. He also captained the club during his career.

He appeared in 104 first grade games and scored 46 tries and kicked 14 goals. 
Stan Ponchard won two premierships with Balmain in 1944 and 1946.
His representative career extended to one appearance for N.S.W. City Firsts in 1948.

He was the nephew of another Balmain stalwart, Des Ponchard who played with the Tigers between 192229.

Ponchard moved to Kempsey, New South Wales after his playing career, and died there on 22 November 2000.

Accolades 

Stan Ponchard was posthumously inducted into the Balmain Tigers Hall of Fame in 2010.

References 

The Encyclopedia of Rugby League Players by Alan Whitaker and Glen Hudson. 1995, Griffin Books

1924 births
2000 deaths
Australian rugby league players
Balmain Tigers players
New South Wales rugby league team players
Sportsmen from New South Wales
City New South Wales rugby league team players
Rugby league players from Sydney
Rugby league halfbacks